Abraham Velázquez Iribe (born 17 March 1953) is a Mexican politician affiliated with the Institutional Revolutionary Party.  he served as Deputy of the LIX Legislature of the Mexican Congress representing Sinaloa.

References

1953 births
Living people
People from Sinaloa
Institutional Revolutionary Party politicians
Deputies of the LIX Legislature of Mexico
Members of the Chamber of Deputies (Mexico) for Sinaloa